Hendrika Ruger is a Dutch-Canadian author, publisher, and the founder of Netherlandic Press publishing company.

History 
Hendrika Ruger was born in 1928 and began publishing in the late 1950s. In 1957, Ruger's paper "National Music" was presented at the University of Windsor's Annual Music Meeting. Hendrika Ruger graduated from the University of Windsor in Canada in May 1971. In 1976, Ruger was appointed as a Specialist Librarian at Windsor's Carnegie Library.

In 1981, Hendrika Ruger founded Netherlandic Press, a publishing company focused on literary works by Dutch-Canadians and Canadians of Dutch descent. In the 1980s and 1990s, Netherlandic Press published eight volumes of poetry and short fiction by Dutch-Canadians, as well as several English translations of Dutch texts. Ruger's books have celebrated Dutch-Canadian writers such as Guy Vanderhaeghe, Aritha Van Herk and Ralph D. Witten. In a review of Hendrika Ruger's book Distant Kin, Tamara J. Palmer wrote that "although it is certainly not heavy handed in its exploration of what might be called 'the Dutch-Canadian experience,' Hendrika Ruger makes clear that the stories and poems collected here do represent recent attempts by the children of immigrants to examine the history of their parents' migration and struggle and to give their discoveries academic or literary form."

Recognition 
In 2004, Stephanie Bolster celebrated Hendrika Ruger for Ruger's "ongoing support" of Dutch-Canadian poet Diana Brebner.

Bibliography 
As per OCLC Worldcat

Under Dutch Skies: A Collection of Poems by Dutch Authors, 1981, 
The Revolution Begins in Bruges: A Collection of Poems (Translation), 1983, 
From a Chosen Land: A Dutch-Canadian Anthology of Poetry and Prose, 1983, 
Distant Kin: Dutch Canadian Stories and Poems, 1987, 
Dutch Quintet: A Collection of Poems and Stories by Dutch-Canadians, 1988 
Transplanted Lives: Dutch-Canadian Stories and Poems, 1988, 
Insight: Canadian Writers View Holland, 1988, 
Dutch Voices: A Collection of Stories and Poems by Dutch-Canadians, 1989, 
Buffaloberries and Saskatoons: Stories and Poetry From Western Canada by Dutch-Canadians, 1991,

Notes

References

External links 

Netherlandic Press

1928 births
Living people
Dutch emigrants to Canada
20th-century Canadian women writers
University of Windsor alumni
Canadian publishers (people)
20th-century Canadian translators
Dutch–English translators